Jackson White may also refer to:

 Jackson White (actor) (born 1996), American actor
 Jack White (basketball) (born 1997), Australian basketball player
 Ramapough Mountain Indians, at times referred to pejoratively as "Jackson Whites"

See also 
 Jack White (disambiguation)
 John White (disambiguation)